Edwin Redvers Baden Herod (16 May 1900 – 9 May 1973) was a professional footballer who played for Barking Town, Ilford, Great Eastern Railway Works F.C., Charlton Athletic, Brentford, Tottenham Hotspur, Chester, Swindon Town and Clapton Orient. He made over 500 appearances in the Football League.

Football career 
Herod played for non League clubs Barking Town, Ilford and Great Eastern Railway Works before joining Charlton Athletic in 1921, the full back played 236 matches and scored twice in all competitions between 1921–27 at the Valley. He joined Brentford in 1928, his £1500 fee breaking the club's incoming record. Herod played a further 28 games before joining Tottenham Hotspur in February 1929 for a then club record fee of £4,000. Herod featured in a total of 58 matches in all competitions for the Lilywhites. After leaving White Hart Lane, Herod had spells at Chester, Swindon Town, before signing for Clapton Orient, where he ended his playing career.

References 

1900 births
1973 deaths
Footballers from Ilford
English footballers
English Football League players
Barking F.C. players
Ilford F.C. players
Charlton Athletic F.C. players
Brentford F.C. players
Tottenham Hotspur F.C. players
Chester City F.C. players
Swindon Town F.C. players
Leyton Orient F.C. players
Association football fullbacks